The moderator band (also known as septomarginal trabecula) is a band of cardiac muscle found in the right ventricle of the heart. It is well-marked in sheep and some other animals. It extends from the base of the anterior papillary muscle to the ventricular septum.

Structure 
The moderator band is located in the right ventricle. The moderator band connects the base of the anterior papillary muscles to the ventricular septum.

Function 
The moderator band is important because it carries part of the right bundle branch of the atrioventricular bundle of the conduction system of the heart to the anterior papillary muscle. This shortcut across the chamber of the ventricle ensures equal conduction time in the left and right ventricles, allowing for coordinated contraction of the anterior papillary muscle.

Clinical significance 
The moderator band is often used by radiologists and obstetricians to more easily identify the right ventricle in prenatal ultrasound.

History 
From its attachments it was thought to prevent overdistension of the ventricle, and was named the "moderator band". It was first described by Leonardo da Vinci in his exploration of human anatomy.

Additional images

See also
 Trabecula

References

External links
 Videos and photos of moderator band
 Photo of "septomarginal trabiculation" at acc.org
 Photo with caption "moderator band" at tjc.edu
 Sonogram

Heart